"Drunk on Love" is a 1994 song by Polish-born singer Basia from her third album The Sweetest Illusion. The track was a no. 1 on Billboards Dance Club Songs chart and remains one of Basia's biggest hits.

Overview
The song was written by Basia Trzetrzelewska, Danny White and Peter Ross, and produced by Danny and Basia. It is an uptempo jazz-pop composition with layered scat singing. The track served as the third overall single from The Sweetest Illusion, preceded in 1993 by "More Fire Than Flame", released only in Japan, and the US-only single "Yearning" earlier in 1994. Remixed by Roger Sanchez into what has been described as a "gospel-house" track, "Drunk on Love" turned out very popular in clubs and eventually reached no. 1 on the US Dance Club Songs (called Club Play at that time), spending a total of twelve weeks on the chart.

"Drunk on Love" received positive feedback from Billboard and Cash Box magazines in 1994. In a retrospective review on AllMusic, the song was rated 3.5 out of five stars.

Music video

The music video for the song was directed by Nick Morris, assisted by cinematographer Alastair Meux. It was filmed in spring 1994, largely in the streets of Soho in London's West End. Basia is pictured performing the song with numerous musicians and people dancing in the street, and singing on a rooftop accompanied by her partner Kevin Robinson (later of Simply Red) who then performs a trumpet solo. The pair is also pictured riding an open top car through the streets at night. The video shows footage of Cambridge Circus and Soho Square, and briefly features popular local places Ronnie Scott's Jazz Club, Bar Italia, Soho Brasserie on Old Compton Street, and the now-defunct hair salon Cuts on Frith Street. Distant shots of London landmarks BT Tower, Big Ben and St Paul's Cathedral are also included. In 2009, the video was released on a bonus DVD included in the special edition of Basia's album It's That Girl Again.

Track listings

7" single
A. "Drunk on Love" – 4:44
B. "An Olive Tree" – 4:59

US 12" single
A1. "Drunk on Love" (Roger's Ultimate Anthem Mix) – 11:40
A2. "Drunk on Love" (Downtown Club Mix) – 5:57
B1. "Drunk on Love" (40oz of Love Dub) – 9:00
B2. "Drunk on Love" (Hands in the Air Dub) – 5:56

UK 12" single
A1. "Drunk on Love" (Roger's Ultimate Anthem Mix) – 11:50
A2. "Drunk on Love" (Album Version) – 4:46
B1. "Drunk on Love" (40oz of Love Dub) – 9:05
B2. "Drunk on Love" (Hands in the Air Dub) – 5:56

CD single
 "Drunk on Love" (Edit) – 4:07
 "Drunk on Love" (Instrumental) – 4:44
 "An Olive Tree" – 4:59

US CD maxi single
 "Drunk on Love" (Single Edit) – 4:06
 "Drunk on Love" (Downtown Radio Edit) – 3:30
 "Drunk on Love" (Extended Mix) – 7:50
 "Drunk on Love" (Downtown Club Mix) – 5:57
 "Drunk on Love" (Roger's Ultimate Anthem Mix) – 11:40

UK CD maxi single
 "Drunk on Love" (Radio Edit) – 4:06
 "Third Time Lucky" (New Version) – 4:06
 "Perfect Mother" (Extended Mix) – 3:51
 "Drunk on Love" (40oz of Love Dub) – 9:05

Charts

Weekly charts

Year-end charts

References

External links
 The official Basia website

1994 singles
1994 songs
Acid jazz songs
Basia songs
Dance-pop songs
Epic Records singles
Songs written by Basia
Songs written by Danny White (musician)